Kaiserpfalz is a municipality in the Burgenlandkreis district, in Saxony-Anhalt, Germany. It was formed by the merger of the previously independent municipalities Bucha, Memleben and Wohlmirstedt, on 1 July 2009.

References

Burgenlandkreis